Czech Lion Award for Most Popular Film was an award given to the film that was most successful in Czech cinema. It was ended in 2013. Until 1999 the category also allowed foreign films to be awarded.

Winners

External links

Czech Lion Awards
Awards established in 1993